Psicothema is a quarterly peer-reviewed open access scientific journal covering psychology. It was established in 1989 in Asturias, Spain, and is published by the University of Oviedo's Psychology Faculty and the Psychological Association of the Principality of Asturias. The editor-in-chief is José Muñiz. According to the Journal Citation Reports, the journal has a 2018 impact factor of 1.551.

References

External links

Psychology journals
Quarterly journals
Multilingual journals
Publications established in 1989
University of Oviedo